Dona Girley Grace Gunawardana (born 15 November 1935 – died 11 March 2012 as ගර්ලි ගුණවර්ධන) [Sinhala]), popularly as Girley Gunawardana, was an actress in Sri Lankan cinema. She is the mother of popular actress Sabeetha Perera.

Personal life
Gunawardana was born on 15 November 1935 in Mount Lavinia as the fifth child of the family. She had three elder brothers - Titus, Lionel, Erwin - and one elder sister and one younger sister, Rose. She was educated at Girls High School Mount Lavinia. 

Gunawardana was married to popular film actor Stanley Perera. She identified Stanley through her friends Bhadra Marapana and A.J. De Zoysa. On 21 July 1956, they secretly got engaged. It was a secret, even though both were acting together. The couple have four daughters - Sandya, Sadna and Sabeetha and Chandima. Third daughter Sabeetha Perera is a popular actress in Sinhala cinema, who acted in more than 70 films. Sabeetha also won Sarasaviya Award for the best actress in 1985.

She died on 11 March 2012 at the age of 76. Her remains were kept at no: 286, Sri Jayewardenepura Mawatha, Kottte her residence. The funeral took place at Borella Cemetery at 6.30 pm on 13 March 2012.

Career
During school times, she learned drama under Ailean Sarachchandra, wife of popular playwright Ediriweera Sarachchandra. She had the opportunity to dance under Neranjana Devi who taught dance and acting under Ailean. Her first acting in public came through the stage play Dope Aya.

In 1952, there was an advertisement published by Sri Murugan New Art Film Company for a vacancy for an actress for the latest film Prema Tharagaya.  She went to the "Sundara" studio in Kandana with two of her friends. She was selected to a minor role in the film under the guidance of Laddy Ranasinghe. She also got a part of a song as a friend of the lead actress Ayesha Weerakoon.

As a result of Prema Tharagaya, Gunawardana was selected for S. M. Nayagam's next production Puduma Leli in 1953 along with Prem Jayanth and Nanda Leelanayake. In the film, she also had a dance scene.

She learned a lot from Sirisena Wimalaweera as her acting master during the shooting of popular film Saradiel in 1953. She played a lead role "Thangamma" in the film and it became highly popular.

After the secret marriage, Stanley and Girley acted as lovers in the 1956 film Duppathage Dukka. In the film, Stanley played the role "Thilak", a rebellious university youth and Girley played "Nalini". Laddy Ranasinghe played as "Dharma Sri", grandfather of Nalini. There was a scene where "Dharma Sri" slaps "Nalini". The shot came real and Girley had to hospitalized for three days due to the slap.

After the film Duppathage Dukka, she acted in several commercially successful films such as Ganthera, Suba Sarana Sepa Sithe, Sasaraka Hati, Laa Dalu, Hathara Maha Nidhanaya, Iwasana Danaa, Davena Pipasaya, Tom Pachaya and Rasa Rahasak. In 1984, Girley acted together with her own daughter Sabeetha in the film Deweni Gamana, which marked her second journey in the cinema with an adult role for the first time. In the 1967 film Iwasana Danaa, Girley starring with her husband Stanley Perera and her daughter Sabeetha.

She left the cinema after having children. However she appeared in few minor roles hereafter. Her last cinema appearance was in 1994 film Ahas Maliga.

Filmography

References

External links
 කලා ලොවේ තරු ජෝඩු
 තරු අම්මලාගේ තරු දූලා
 කෙටි කාලයකින් සබඳතා බිඳී යන කලා ලෝකයේ ආදර්ශවත් පවුල් කීපයක්

Notes

1935 births
2012 deaths
Sri Lankan film actresses
Sinhalese actresses